Marko Janković (Serbian Cyrillic: Марко Јанковић; born 9 July 1995) is a Montenegrin professional footballer who plays as a midfielder for Azerbaijan Premier League club Qarabağ and the Montenegro national team.

Club career

Early career
Born in Cetinje, Janković joined Partizan from Lovćen as a trainee in 2007. He spent the next five years in the club's youth setup, before making his senior debuts with their affiliated club Teleoptik in the 2012–13 Serbian First League.

Olympiacos
In summer 2013, Janković was transferred to Greek champions Olympiacos on a four-year contract. He played for their youth side in the inaugural 2013–14 UEFA Youth League, but failed to make any first team appearances.

In the summer of 2014, Janković was sent on loan to Serbian club OFK Beograd. He scored on his league debut after coming on as a substitute in a 3–2 home win over Novi Pazar. Throughout the 2014–15 Serbian SuperLiga, Janković scored four goals from 19 games.

On 31 August 2015, Janković was loaned to Slovenian club Maribor with an option to buy. He made his league debut for the side on 23 September in a 1–1 home draw with Domžale, coming on as a 62nd-minute substitute for Dare Vršič. During his spell at Maribor, Janković helped the club win the Slovenian Cup, playing the full 120 minutes and converting his penalty kick in the shootout against Celje in the final.

Partizan
On 15 June 2016, Janković joined his parent club Partizan on a season-long loan. He wore the number 95 shirt and made his competitive debut on 14 July in a 0–0 home draw with Zagłębie Lubin in the first leg of the UEFA Europa League second qualifying round. On 6 November, Janković netted his first official goal for Partizan, opening the scoring in an eventual 4–0 home league win over Novi Pazar. In his first campaign with Partizan, Janković helped the club win the double.

On 14 September 2017, Janković scored the opening goal in a 1–1 away draw against Swiss club Young Boys in the Europa League group stage. He finished the 2017–18 season with 42 appearances in all competitions and scored seven goals in the process.

On 10 November 2018, Janković made his 100th competitive appearance for Partizan in a 2–0 home league victory over Radnik Surdulica. Upon leaving Partizan, he forgave at least €160,000 worth of unpaid salary.

SPAL
On 31 January 2019, Janković signed a contract with Serie A side SPAL lasting until June 2022, in a transfer worth €1.8 million. Only half of the transfer fee went to Partizan, as the other 50% of the fee went to Olympiacos due to a percentage clause from his previous transfer from Olympiacos to Partizan. On 15 January 2021, Janković and SPAL mutually agreed to part ways.

Crotone (loan)
On 31 January 2020, Janković joined Serie B club Crotone on loan until 30 June 2020.

Beitar Jerusalem
On 3 February 2021, Janković joined Israeli Premier League side Beitar Jerusalem as a free-agent.

Hapoel Tel Aviv
On 1 February 2022, he signed for Hapoel Tel Aviv.

International career
Janković was capped for Montenegro at under-17, under-19 and under-21 level. He made his full international debut for Montenegro on 29 May 2016, coming on as a substitute in a 1–0 friendly loss away against Turkey. On 10 September 2018, Janković scored his first international goal for Montenegro in a 2–1 home victory over Lithuania in the 2018–19 UEFA Nations League C.

Career statistics

Club

International

Scores and results list Montenegro's goal tally first, score column indicates score after each Janković goal.

Honours
Maribor
 Slovenian Cup: 2015–16

Partizan
 Serbian SuperLiga: 2016–17
 Serbian Cup: 2016–17, 2017–18

References

External links

 
 
 

1995 births
Living people
Sportspeople from Cetinje
Association football midfielders
Montenegrin footballers
Montenegro youth international footballers
Montenegro under-21 international footballers
Montenegro international footballers
FK Partizan players
FK Teleoptik players
NK Maribor players
OFK Beograd players
Olympiacos F.C. players
S.P.A.L. players
F.C. Crotone players
Beitar Jerusalem F.C. players
Hapoel Tel Aviv F.C. players
Qarabağ FK players
Serbian First League players
Serbian SuperLiga players
Slovenian PrvaLiga players
Serie A players
Serie B players
Israeli Premier League players
Azerbaijan Premier League players
Montenegrin expatriate footballers
Expatriate footballers in Serbia
Expatriate footballers in Greece
Expatriate footballers in Slovenia
Expatriate footballers in Italy
Expatriate footballers in Israel
Expatriate footballers in Azerbaijan
Montenegrin expatriate sportspeople in Serbia
Montenegrin expatriate sportspeople in Greece
Montenegrin expatriate sportspeople in Slovenia
Montenegrin expatriate sportspeople in Italy
Montenegrin expatriate sportspeople in Israel
Montenegrin expatriate sportspeople in Azerbaijan